Never Forget – The Ultimate Collection is the third greatest hits album by English boy band Take That. It was released on 14 November 2005, nearly ten years after their initial split. It has sold over 2.36 million copies in the UK since release.

Release
Never Forget was released on 14 November 2005. The album contains 16 of the band's 18 singles, excluding their debut single, "Do What U Like", and the internationally released "Sunday to Saturday", as well as three bonus recordings. One of the bonus recordings, "Today I've Lost You", was recorded especially for the album after it was originally scrapped in 1995. "Relight My Fire" was remixed, and was due to be issued as a single to promote the release of the album. However, the single was withdrawn just two days before its initial release date. All editions of the album feature the same track listing.

The album sold 90,000 copies in its first week, peaking at number 2 on the UK Albums Chart behind Confessions on a Dance Floor by Madonna. It has been certified as 8× Platinum in the UK and has sold 2.36 million copies. Since its release, the album spent 218 weeks in the UK Top 100.

A DVD was released at the same time.

Track listing

Charts

Weekly charts

Year-end charts

Decade-end charts

Certifications

Release history

References

Take That albums
2005 greatest hits albums
2005 video albums
Music video compilation albums